Gastrocopta pentodon, common name the comb snaggletooth, is a species of minute air-breathing land snail, a terrestrial pulmonate gastropod mollusk or micromollusk in the family Vertiginidae, the vertigo snails.

References

External links 
 Photo of shell of Gastrocopta pentodon
 Gastrocopta pentodon in the Internet Archive

Vertiginidae
Gastropods described in 1821